Antinoos Albanis (born 22 May 1983) is a Greek actor.

Biography
Born on 22 May 1983 in Athens and raised in Chalkida, he is a graduate of the drama school Karolos Koun (2001–04). He achieved his television debut as an actor on Alpha TV.

His voice was featured in many ads on TV and in many compilations in cinema. More recently he was cast in the film Christmas Tango, an adaptation of a book by Yannis Drakoularakos, in which he plays a gay soldier and dance instructor named Lazarou.

Film

References

1983 births
Living people
Male actors from Athens
Greek male television actors
Greek male voice actors